Air Inter (Lignes Aériennes Intérieures) was a semi-public French domestic airline. Before its merger with Air France, the airline was headquartered in Paray-Vieille-Poste, Essonne. Earlier in its life, it was headquartered in the 1st arrondissement of Paris.

Air Inter was incorporated on 12 November 1954. It operated its first commercial flight between Paris and Strasbourg on 16 March 1958. However, it was 1960 when the airline started regular commercial services.

The company established its operational and engineering base at Paris-Orly Airport, where its flights were concentrated at Orly Ouest, Orly Airport's West Terminal.

Air Inter was founded as a semi-public entity to provide efficient domestic air transport at the lowest cost. Its financial backers included French public and private sector transport businesses in road, rail and air transport, as well as banks.

Air France and Société Nationale des Chemins de Fer Français (SNCF), the state railway company, were Air Inter's two largest public sector shareholders, each holding 25% in the airline. Union des Transports Aériens (UTA) was its largest private sector investor. UTA initially held a 15% minority stake in Air Inter. UTA subsequently increased its shareholding to 36%, becoming the largest single shareholder.

On 12 January 1990, Air Inter, with UTA and Air France, became part of an enlarged Air France group, which in turn became a subsidiary of Groupe Air France. Air Inter changed to Air Inter Europe following a merger with Air France and UTA. On 1 April 1997, it was absorbed into Air France. On that day, the firm ceased to exist as a legal entity within Groupe Air France.

History

On 23 February 1960, France's Ministry of Public Works and Transport decided to transfer Air France's domestic monopoly to Air Inter. This provided the impetus for Air Inter to start scheduled services within metropolitan France, as well as between the mainland and Corsica. Though a private sector company because of its limited liability status, Air Inter was compelled to operate unprofitable regional domestic routes to justify its domestic monopoly on profitable routes from Paris.

Air Inter primarily operated high-frequency scheduled internal flights from Paris Orly to cities in metropolitan France, principally Lyon, Marseille, Nice, Toulouse, Bordeaux, Strasbourg and Mulhouse. Following the opening of Charles de Gaulle Airport near the northern Paris suburb of Roissy-en-France and the transfer of the bulk of Air France's international operations from Orly to Charles de Gaulle Airport from 1974, as well as the simultaneous transfer of UTA's Le Bourget-based operation to that airport, Air Inter began serving these routes from Charles de Gaulle as well (with the exception of Nice) to feed domestic passengers into those airlines' international networks.

Air Inter also linked Orly with additional second and third-tier provincial French towns as well as with all three commercial airports on Corsica (Ajaccio, Bastia, Calvi). The airline operated regional domestic scheduled routes between major French cities as well.

Many of Air Inter's routes serving smaller towns were contracted to TAT.

Prior to the liberalisation of the internal air market in the European Union (EU) during the early 1990s, Air Inter was a pillar of the French air transport industry with Air France, UTA and TAT.

During that period Air Inter had a large share of the domestic market. It was the only airline plying most of the domestic trunk routes within metropolitan France on a regular scheduled basis, especially from and to Paris. The exceptions were Paris-Nice and Paris-Basle/Mulhouse. Air Inter's flights between Paris Orly and Nice competed with Air France's Paris-Charles de Gaulle — Nice, and Orly—Nice flights. Air Inter competed head-on with Swissair, the former Swiss flag carrier, between Paris Charles de Gaulle and Basle/Mulhouse.The difference between the competing Air Inter and Swissair services on this route was that the former's passengers had to use the terminal at Basle/Mulhouse airport through the domestic channel that connected the airport to the French city of Mulhouse, whereas the latter's used the international channel that linked the airport with the Swiss city of Basle. For this reason, Air Inter's flights were categorised as domestic while Swissair's were international.

In addition, UTA had limited rights to carry passengers, cargo and mail on the internal legs of its long-haul services, between Paris Charles de Gaulle and Lyon, Marseille, Nice as well as Bordeaux. However, flights were too infrequent to pose a threat to Air Inter.

SNCF, one of Air Inter's two largest public sector shareholders, was also the company's main competitor on domestic trunk routes inside France. This intensified when SNCF began high-speed, high-frequency Train à Grande Vitesse (TGV) services on purpose-built tracks from 1981. The launch of TGV services between Paris and Lyon, one of Air Inter's busiest as well as shortest routes, in 1981 led to a reduction in frequency and smaller aircraft on Air Inter's competing service.

The only other domestic air routes on which Air Inter competed with Air France in the pre-liberalisation era were routes linking the mainland with Corsica.

In 1977, Air Inter purchased a 20% stake from Air France in the latter's charter affiliate Air Charter International, in return for ceasing to be a rival supplier of charter airline seats in the French inclusive tour market.

Annual passenger numbers on Air Inter's domestic scheduled network grew steadily to 21 million, actually beating Air France one year. This established the firm as the largest scheduled domestic airline in Europe.

Air Inter was also one of the few European ultra short-haul, mainline scheduled operators to be profitable most of the time and was a forerunner of today's low-cost airlines in Europe. Fares were lower than domestic air fares elsewhere in Europe and competing rail fares, with short turnarounds (35 minutes for a full 314-seat A300 was common), no seat allocation, no frills service on board and minimum crews.

On 1 January 1995, Air Inter lost its monopoly on the domestic trunk routes from Paris Orly. From that day, any EU-based rival was free to compete on these routes, without restrictions on capacity, frequency or fares.

The sale of controlling stakes in Air Inter and UTA to Air France, as well as integration of both of the former into the latter, was part of a French government plan to create a unified, national carrier with the economies of scale and global reach to counter threats from the liberalisation of the EU's internal air transport market.

Fleet
Air Inter pioneered Category 3 all-weather landings and started operating Category 3 minima with Caravelles — upgrading with enhanced head-up displays on Mercure and A320s.

Listed below are the main aircraft types that were part of Air Inter's fleet at one point or another throughout its 37 years of continuous operations:

 Airbus A300 B2/B4 series
 Airbus A320 100/200 series
 Airbus A321-100
 Airbus A330-300
 Dassault Mercure
 Douglas DC-3/C-47
 Fokker F27 Friendship 500 series
 Fokker 100
 Nord 262
 Sud Aviation Caravelle III series/12 series ("Super 12")
 Vickers Viscount 700 series.

Air Inter entered the jet age with the Caravelle III.

Air Inter was an early operator of the Airbus A300, the European aircraft manufacturer's first commercial jetliner and the airline's first widebodied aircraft. The fleet reached 22 aircraft at its peak with aircraft being acquired second hand up to 1992.

Air Inter was also a launch customer for the Dassault Mercure, the French answer to the Boeing 737, as well as the Airbus A320 (eventually building a fleet of 33 of the 320 variant alone), the only airline customer in the world for the former and joint launch customer with Air France and British Caledonian for the latter.

The Mercure entered commercial airline service with Air Inter on June 4, 1974. Dassault Aviation's inability to find other customers for the Mercure resulted in the French government granting Air Inter a subsidy of £10,775,000. This helped the airline bear the financial burden of operating an "orphan fleet" of only ten aircraft. In addition to the ten aircraft that formed part of Air Inter's original order for the Mercure, the airline had the aircraft's prototype converted to airline standard as well. This subsequently joined the fleet, increasing the company's Mercure sub-fleet to eleven. It was withdrawn from service in 1995, after 20 years' uninterrupted service.

The A320 entered service with Air Inter in 1988.

The A330 was the last aircraft type to join the Air Inter fleet in 1994. Air Inter was the launch operator of the type.

Incidents and Accidents
There were 12 recorded incidents/accidents involving Air Inter aircraft throughout 37 years of uninterrupted commercial operations, three of which were fatal. One of the other nine reported incidents included an aircraft hijacking, resulting in the loss of one life.

The airline's three fatal accidents were:

 On 12 August 1963,  Air Inter Flight 2611, a Vickers Viscount 708 (registration F-BGNV) operating a scheduled flight from Lille to Lyon crashed while holding over Tramoyes at FL30 on the instructions of Lyon ATC, resulting in the deaths of the aircraft's 20 occupants (four crew members and 16 passengers) as well as one person on the ground. A storm forced the flight crew to request ATC permission to descend to FL25. In response, the crew received clearance for a straight-in approach to Lyon Bron Airport's runway 17. Eyewitnesses reported the aircraft flying low in an easterly direction in the heart of the storm. The aircraft struck trees, the roof of a farmhouse and a telephone pole before coming to rest in a field. The investigation board cited exceptionally bad weather where the aircraft was instructed to hold, as well as a possibility of lightning dazzling the crew and causing temporary blindness or appreciably incapacitating both pilots.
 On 27 October 1972, Air Inter Flight 696Y, a Vickers Viscount 724 (registration F-BMCH) operating a scheduled night flight from Lyon to Clermont-Ferrand crashed into the Pic du Picon mountain 44 km east of Clermont-Ferrand airport at 1,000 ft killing 60 of the aircraft's 68 occupants, including all five crew and 55 of the 63 passengers. The accident was caused by the flight deck crew's failure to notice their plane's radio compass had shifted 180 degrees, most likely as a result of electrical discharges in rainfall blocking the signals emitted by Clermont-Ferrand's non-directional beacon (NDB), while being instructed to fly a holding pattern prior to receiving clearance to descend to 3,600 ft. This resulted in the crew's initiating their descent too early, which set the aircraft on a collision course with the mountain.
 On 20 January 1992, Air Inter Flight 148, operated by an Airbus A320-111 (registration F-GGED), crashed into a ridge near Mount Sainte-Odile in the Vosges mountains while on final approach to Strasbourg at the end of a scheduled flight from Lyon. This resulted in the deaths of 87 of the aircraft's occupants (five crew members, 82 passengers), the worst accident in company history. There were nine survivors (one crew member, eight passengers). The accident was caused by the aircraft's wrongly programmed Flight Control Unit (FCU), a consequence of the crew's failure to notice that the FCU was in [incorrect] vertical speed mode when programming the angle of descent (-3.3 [3.3 degrees]). The excessive descent (3,300 ft./minute instead of 800 ft./minute) took the aircraft below its minimum safe altitude. This resulted in the aircraft's striking trees and a 2,710 ft high ridge in the cloud-covered mountains.

The following was a notable, non-fatal incident:

 On 28 December 1971, Vickers Viscount (registration: F-BOEA) was damaged beyond economic repair at Clermont-Ferrand Aulnat Airport when it departed the runway on a training flight during a simulated failure of number 4 engine.

References

External links

Air France/Air Inter Europe (Archive)
FT.com/Business Life, The Monday Interview, 30 September 2007 - Pilot who found the right trajectory
M.R. Golder, The Changing Nature of French Dirigisme - A Case Study of Air France, St. Edmunds Hall, Oxford. Thesis submitted at Trinity College, 1997
Air France (Airline, France)
Air Inter at the Aviation Safety Network Database
Air Inter DC-3 Museum Pictures
Air Inter F-27-500 on a visit to Berlin Tegel on April 9, 1978
Air Inter Dassault Mercure 100 at Basle/Mulhouse Euro Airport during August 1985
Air Inter Aerospatiale SE-210 Caravelle 12 at Paris Charles de Gaulle Airport on October 16, 1990
Air Inter A300 B2-1C departing Palma de Mallorca Son San Juan Airport on August 5, 1993
Air Inter A330-301 at Paris Orly Airport on September 14, 1993
Air Inter F100 at Madrid Barajas Airport on September 10, 1995
Air Inter timetable images
Air Inter uniform images, 1990s
 (various backdated issues relating to Air Inter, 1960–1997)
 (various backdated issues relating to Air Inter scheduled flight information, 1960–1997)

 
Defunct airlines of France
Airlines established in 1954
Airlines disestablished in 1997
French companies established in 1954
French companies disestablished in 1997